Willy Schatz (1903–1976) was a German art director of Baltic German origin. He designed the sets for numerous film productions in post-war West Germany including Fritz Lang's The Tiger of Eschnapur and The Indian Tomb in 1959.

Selected filmography
 Two Times Lotte (1950)
 Love on Ice (1950)
 Das Riesenrad (1951)
 The White Horse Inn (1952)
 The Immortal Vagabond (1953)
 The Postponed Wedding Night (1953)
 Cabaret (1954)
 Marianne of My Youth (1955)
 The Mistress of Solderhof (1955)
 Love, Summer and Music (1956)
 The Doctor of Stalingrad (1958)
 The Domestic Tyrant (1959)
 The Tiger of Eschnapur (1959)
 The Indian Tomb (1959)
 The Haunted Castle (1960)
 Axel Munthe, The Doctor of San Michele (1962)
 A Mission for Mr. Dodd (1964)
 Living It Up (1966)

References

Bibliography 
 Langford, Michelle. Directory of World Cinema: Germany. Intellect Books, 2012.

External links 
 

1903 births
1976 deaths
German art directors
Emigrants from the Russian Empire to Germany